The Libera Award for Best Dance/Electronic Record (known as Best Dance/Electronic Album prior to 2021) is an award presented by the American Association of Independent Music at the annual Libera Award which recognizes "best dance or electronic music album released commercially in the United States by an independent label" since 2017.

At the 2022 ceremony, the award was split into two categories: Best Dance Record and Best Electronic Record.

Winners and nominees

Multiple nominations and awards

Artists that received multiple nominations
2 nominations
Arca
Caribou
Dawn Richard
Flying Lotus
Oneohtrix Point Never
Tycho
Yaeji

References

D